
The following is a list of Playboy Playmates of 2001.  Playboy magazine names its Playmate of the Month each month throughout the year.

January

Irina Voronina (Russian: Ирина Воронина, born December 19, 1977, in Dzerzhinsk, Russia) is a Russian model and Playboy's Playmate of the Month for January 2001. She has also modeled for Perfect 10.

February

Lauren Michelle Hill (born June 27, 1979) is an American model and actress. She appeared on the cover of Playboy on the October (Girls of Conference USA) 2000 issue. She is Playboy Playmate of the Month in February 2001. Hill was a cheerleader at the University of South Carolina while studying journalism. While modeling and acting, she is known as Lauren James.

March

Miriam Gonzalez (born July 8, 1977, in Queens, New York) is an American glamour model. She is Playboys Playmate of the Month for March 2001. She has appeared in Playboy videos and Playboy Special Editions.

April

Katie Lohmann (born January 29, 1980 in Scottsdale, Arizona) is a model, actress, and the Playboy Playmate of the Month for April 2001. Her first appearance in Playboy was in the Playmate 2000 search pictorial, published in the December 1999 issue.

May

Crista Nicole Wagner (born July 24, 1978) better known as Crista Nicole is an American model. She is Playboys Playmate of the Month for May 2001. Her centerfold was photographed by Arny Freytag.

June

Heather Spytek (born December 12, 1977) is an American model. She is Playboys Playmate of the Month in June 2001 and has appeared in numerous Playboy videos.

July

Kimberley Stanfield (born November 18, 1981, in Vancouver, British Columbia) is a Canadian model. She is Playboy magazine's Playmate of the Month for July 2001.

August

Jennifer Walcott (born May 8, 1977, in Youngstown, Ohio) is an American glamour model and actress best known as Playboy magazine's Playmate of the Month for August 2001.

September

Dalene Kurtis (born November 12, 1977, in Apple Valley, California) is an American model. She was Playboys Playmate of the Month for September 2001 and Playmate of the Year for 2002. She is the first Playboy Playmate to shoot with shaved pubic area.

October

Stephanie Heinrich (born November 13, 1979) is an American model and actress. 
She became Playboy's first Cyber Girl of the Week in September 2000 and the first Cyber Girl of the Month (in January 2001). She is Playboys Playmate of the Month for October 2001 and has appeared in Playboy videos.

In 2015 she published a memoir, "A Bunny Tells All", about her work for Playboy.

November

Lindsey Eve Vuolo (born October 19, 1981) is an American model best known for her appearance in Playboy as the November 2001 Playmate. Vuolo has appeared in Playboy features and in its special edition magazines. She was also photographed by Artie Lange for a nude pictorial in the "Celebrity Photographer" section of its website.

Pictures of Vuolo's bat mitzvah ceremony at age 13 were included in her Playboy pictorial. The fact that she attended synagogue while she was active with Playboy (although none of the men in the synagogue acknowledged recognizing her) led to a fair amount of media attention. "I consider myself a nice Jewish girl", Vuolo says of herself.

December

Shanna Moakler (born March 28, 1975) is an American model, actress, reality television star and a former beauty queen. She was the winner of the Miss New York USA pageant in 1995 and was originally the first runner-up at Miss USA 1995. She was later crowned Miss USA after Chelsi Smith won Miss Universe.

Moakler began her modeling career at the age of fifteen. She appeared in various publications, including such magazines as Cosmopolitan and Brentwood. She is Playboy's December 2001 Playmate of the Month. She has admitted that posing nude was "a little scary at first."

See also
 List of people in Playboy 2000–2009

References

2001-related lists
2001
Playmates Of 2001